John Hood (c.1817 – 22 November 1877) was an Australian chemist and politician, member of the Victorian Legislative Council, and later, the Victorian Legislative Assembly.

Early life
Hood was born in County Antrim, Ireland, the son of James Hood, a farmer, and Margaret, nee O'Neill.

Early career
In June 1840, Hood arrived in Melbourne and joined the firm of Robert Wilson & Company around 1841, later becoming head of the firm.

Political career
On the inauguration of the constitution in 1856 Hood was returned to the Upper House for the Central province until resigning in September 1859. Hood then successfully stood for the Victorian Legislative Assembly seat of Belfast.

Family
Hood was father of Sir Joseph Henry Hood (1846–1922), puisne judge of the Supreme Court of Victoria, and grandfather of violinist Florence Hood  (1880–1968).

References

 

1817 births
1877 deaths
Members of the Victorian Legislative Council
People from County Antrim
Irish emigrants to colonial Australia
19th-century Australian politicians
Australian chemists
Irish chemists